Seething Airfield , formerly RAF Seething, is located  south southeast of Norwich, East Anglia, England.

Seething Airfield (EGSJ) is a privately owned airfield in Norfolk, England and is home to the Waveney Flying Group. Situated in the village of Mundham, paradoxically just outside of Seething, south east of Norwich and just a few miles from the East Coast. The aerodrome is officially open to visitors Saturdays and Sundays from 0900 to around 1700 hrs (sunset in winter).

Founded in 1960, the Waveney Flying Group leased the former USAAF airbase from local farmers and went on to purchase the land in 1963. Its close proximity to Great Yarmouth meant it saw quite a bit of celebrity use in the 60s and 70s when stars such as The Hollies, The Rolling Stones and Mike and Bernie Winters dropped in. In latter years, the new millennium has seen both the club house and hangars developed culminating with their official opening by Wing Cdr. Ken Wallis MBE in 2001.

See also
 List of Norfolk airports, airfields, and aerodromes
 List of airports in the United Kingdom

References

External links
Official website of Seething Airfield 
https://www.storiesofthe448th.com/

Airports in England
Transport in Norfolk
Airports in Norfolk